Ernest John Sigley (9 December 1931 – 25 June 2021) was a New Zealand cricketer. He played in five first-class matches for Wellington from 1959 to 1961.

See also
 List of Wellington representative cricketers

References

External links
 

1931 births
2021 deaths
New Zealand cricketers
Wellington cricketers
Cricketers from Wellington City